The 2022–23 season is the 103rd season in the history of Cagliari Calcio and their first season back in the second division since 2016. The club are participating in Serie B and Coppa Italia.

Players

Out on loan

Transfers

In

Out

Pre-season and friendlies

Competitions

Overall record

Serie B

League table

Results summary

Results by round

Matches 
The league fixtures were announced on 15 July 2022.

Coppa Italia

References 

Cagliari Calcio seasons
Cagliari